First Lady of India or First Gentleman of India is the title given to the host of the Rashtrapati Bhavan, usually the spouse of the President of India. There are no official roles or duties assigned to the spouse. The spouse generally attends official ceremonies and functions.

The position of first gentleman of India is currently vacant, as President Draupadi Murmu is widowed.

History
Rajvanshi Devi, the wife of India's first president, was the country's first lady from 1950 until 1962. Devi kept a very low profile during this era and did not attend public events with President Rajendra Prasad.

The post was vacant during the tenure of Sarvepalli Radhakrishnan and was followed by Shah Jahan Begum who was the wife of India's third President Zakir Husain.

Saraswati Bai, wife of the country's fourth president, V. V. Giri, was the first first lady to take a more public role.  Bai's role marked a change from the lower profile of her predecessors. She attended and hosted public events and became a recognizable figure to the Indian public.

Begum Abida Ahmed, India's first lady from 1974 to 1977, further expanded the public role of the first lady's position by organizing ceremonies and official functions at the Rashtrapati Bhavan. She was also the first among the first spouses to hold a public office when she was Member of Parliament between 1980 and 1989.

Usha Narayanan was the first spouse of foreign origin.

Before Pratibha Patil was sworn in as the first female president of India, the role of the wives of the president was to act as the chief hostess of the Bhavan. In 2007, the office room meant for the first lady went for some minor changes to accommodate the husband of Pratibha Patil, Devisingh Ransingh Shekhawat, the country's inaugural "first gentleman".

Former first lady Suvra Mukherjee, the wife of President Pranab Mukherjee, died in office on 18 August 2015. The position of First Lady remained vacant for the remainder of President Mukherjee's term.

The position is currently vacant since 2022 as president Droupadi Murmu is a widow.

Role 
The role of a first spouse is largely ceremonial. The first spouse has no official duties, but he or she generally attends the official ceremonies and functions held at the Rashtrapati Bhavan along with the president. Most of the first spouses have maintained a low profile.

Non-spouses in the role 
In case of the absence of a spouse, another relative of the President may take up the role of host or hostess during official functions at the Rashtrapati Bhavan. However, this is not mandatory, and the role of hostess has been vacant during the tenure of A. P. J. Abdul Kalam.

Zail Singh's daughter had served as hostess for some events. Pranab Mukherjee's daughter Sharmistha Mukherjee served as hostess for some events, during her mother's illness.

List of first ladies and gentlemen of India

See also
 President of India
 Spouse of the prime minister of India
 Second ladies of India

Notes

References

 
India
India politics-related lists